Kavin (/kəvɪn/)(Tamil. கவின் or English. /ˈkɛvɪn/) ) is a unisex given name, which is Tamil/English for "beauty", "grace", "fairness" or "comeliness". The name Kavin may refer to:

People
Kavinn (born 1984), Jamaican football player
Kavin Dave (born 1984), Indian actor
Kavin Jayaram (born 1980), Malaysian comedian
Kav Sandhu (born 1979), British musician
Kavin (actor) (born 1990), Indian film and television actor
Kavin Bharti Mittal, Internet entrepreneur

Other uses

See also
Kevin
Kevan

References

Tamil masculine given names